Wan Pipel (English: One People) is a 1976 Surinamese-Dutch drama film directed by Pim de la Parra. The screenplay was written by Rudi Kross and Lou Lichtveld. The leading roles are played by Borger Breeveld, Diana Gangaram Panday, and Willeke van Ammelrooy.

The film, produced by Wim Verstappen, was the first Surinamese film after independence. The budget was far exceeded and the expected visitor numbers were far from being achieved. The argument that as a result, between 'Pim and Wim' was meant the end for "Scorpio Films".

Plot 
Roy (Borger Breeveld) is an Afro-Surinamese man who studies in the Netherlands. He is recalled by telegram to Suriname because his mother is dying. His Dutch girlfriend Karina (Willeke van Ammelrooy) lends him money for a plane ticket. Back in his homeland, Roy soon becomes obsessed with his own country and its culture. When he falls for an Indo-Surinamese Hindu nurse, Rubia (Diana Gangaram Panday), the conservative Hindu and Black communities are in revolt. Roy will not return to the Netherlands to finish his studies, even if Karina comes to pick him up. His duty is in Suriname, he says.

Cast
 Borger Breeveld - Roy
 Diana Gangaram Panday - Rubia
 Willeke van Ammelrooy - Karina
 Emanuel van Gonter - Roy's father
 Ro Jackson-Breeveld - Roy's mother
 Sieuwpal Soekhlall - Rubia's father
Bhagwandei Mokkumsingh - Rubia's mother
Djardj Soekhlall - Rubia's brother
Paragh Chotkan - Rubia's grandfather
Etwarie Ramdin-Jhawnie - Rubia's grandmother
Asha Bharosa - Rooshni
Ruben Jitan - Rooshni's bridegroom
Henk Gopali - Rubia's cousin
J. Madho - Pandit
 Joyce Mungroo-Ooft - Henna
 Ruud Mungroo - Norman
 Grace Calor-Ooft - Carla
 Otto Sterman - Mr. Frenkel

References

External links

1976 films
Surinamese drama films
Dutch drama films
1970s Dutch-language films
Films set in the Netherlands
Films set in Suriname
Films shot in Suriname
Afro–Latin American culture